Nuculanidae is a family of small saltwater clams, marine bivalve molluscs in the order Nuculanida. Species in this family are found in all seas, from shallow to deep water.

Genera and species
Genera and species within the family Nuculanidae include:
 Acutispinula
 Acutispinula hilleri (Allen & Sanders, 1982) 
 Acutispinula scheltemai (Allen & Sanders, 1982) 
 Adrana H. Adams & A. Adams, 1858 
 Jupiteria
 Jupiteria manawatawhia Powell, 1937) 
 Jupiteria wolffi Dell, 1956
 Jupiteria zealedaformis Dell, 1953
 Ledella
 Ledella aberrata Allen & Sanders, 1996
 Ledella finlayi Powell, 1935
 Ledella herdmani Dell, 1953
 Ledella jamesi Allen & Hannah, 1989
 Ledella librata Dell, 1952 
 Ledella pustulosa Allen & Hannah, 1989 
 Ledella sublevis A. E. Verrill & Bush, 1898
 Ledella ultima (E. A. Smith, 1885) 
 Lembulus  Link, 1807 
 Lembulus pellus  (Linnaeus, 1767)  
 Nuculana
 Nuculana acuta (Conrad, 1832)
 Nuculana aspecta (Dall, 1927)
 Nuculana bipennis (Dall, 1927) 
 Nuculana bushiana (A. E. Verrill, 1884) 
 Nuculana caudata (Donovan, 1801)
 Nuculana cestrota (Dall, 1890) 
 Nuculana concentrica (Say, 1824) 
 Nuculana eborea Conrad, 1848 
 Nuculana fortiana Esteves, 1984 
 Nuculana hebes (E. A. Smith, 1885) 
 Nuculana inaequisculpta Lamy, 1906 
 Nuculana jamaicensis (d’Orbigny in Sagra, 1853) 
 Nuculana kalmartini Weisbord, 1964 
 Nuculana larranagai Klappenbach & Scarabino, 1969 
 Nuculana marella Weisbord, 1964 
 Nuculana minuta (O. F. Müller, 1776)
 Nuculana orixa (Dall, 1927) 
 Nuculana parva (G. B. Sowerby I, 1833) 
 Nuculana pernula (Müller, 1779)
 Nuculana platessa (Dall, 1890) 
 Nuculana pusio (Philippi, 1844) 
 Nuculana rhytida Dall, 1908 
 Nuculana semen (E. A. Smith, 1885) 
 Nuculana solidifacta (Dall, 1886)
 Nuculana solidula (E. A. Smith, 1885)
 Nuculana sufficientia Poppe & Tagaro, 2016 
 Nuculana taphria (Dall, 1898) 
 Nuculana tenuisulcata (Couthouy, 1838) 
 Nuculana verrilliana (Dall, 1886) 
 Nuculana vitrea (d'Orbigny in Sagra, 1853)
 Nuculana vulgaris Pilsbry & Brown, 1913 
 Nuculana whitensis Farinati, 1978 
 Poroleda
 Poroleda lanceolata (Hutton, 1885) 
 Saccella
 Scissuladrana
 Scissuladrana ludmillae Petuch, 1987 
 Thestyleda
 Thestyleda investigator Dell, 1952) 
 Thestyleda louiseae (Clarke, 1962) 
 Tindariopsis
 Tindariopsis sulculata (‘Couthouy’ Gould, 1852)

Fossil taxa:
 Dacromya

References
 
 Powell A. W. B., New Zealand Mollusca, William Collins Publishers Ltd, Auckland, New Zealand 1979 

 
Bivalve families
Extant Permian first appearances